An extraterritorial operation in international law is a law enforcement or military operation that takes place outside the territory or jurisdiction of the state whose forces are conducting the operation, generally within the territory of another sovereign state. Under international law, these activities are generally highly restricted, and it is considered a violation of a state's sovereignty if any other state engages in law enforcement or military operations within another state without gaining that state's consent:

Law enforcement 
The policing of transnational and international crimes is a challenge to state-based law enforcement agencies, as jurisdiction restricts the direct intervention a state's agencies can legally take in another state's jurisdiction, with even basic law enforcement activities such as arrest and detention "tantamount to abduction" when carried out extraterritorially. These explicit limits on extraterritorial law enforcement operations has therefore instead encouraged co-operation between law enforcement agencies of sovereign states, forming supranational agencies such as Interpol to encourage co-operation, and placing additional obligations on the state such as aut dedere aut judicare ("extradite or prosecute") to compel prosecution of certain types of transnational crime, including hijacking of civilian aircraft, taking of civilian hostages, and other acts of terrorism, as well as crimes against diplomats and other "internationally protected persons".

Military operations 
While extraterritorial law enforcement activity is highly restricted and subject to the approval of the 'host' state, traditional interstate military operations assume some degree of extraterritorial operation. As Stigall points out, innate in 'just' war (jus ad bellum) is the expectation that one state may be conducting military activity against, and within the borders, of another state; the laws of armed conflict "[presuppose] extraterritoriality". Therefore, "[i]f the circumstances exist for the 
lawful use of force under jus ad bellum, then so long as a state abides by the rules articulated in jus in bello [the law of war], that state’s extraterritorial actions are considered lawful."

"Unwilling or unable" 
Problems with the legitimacy of extraterritorial operations arise, according to Stigall, when one state is conducting military activity against non-state actors in a state "that is not party to the conflict". Although some commentators suggest that the use of force is permitted in some of these cases, with Deeks' commentary on the 'Unwilling or Unable Test' mentioning sources that recommend that "neutrality law permits a belligerent to use force on a neutral state’s territory if the neutral state is unable or unwilling to prevent violations of its neutrality by another belligerent", Stigall reminds "that such view is not universal, and textual authority for such cross-border attacks is limited".

Humanitarian and human rights law 
For the Council of Europe, key tenets of its human rights law jurisdiction are laid down in Article 1 of the European Convention on Human Rights (ECHR), with the convention employed to complement and reinforce the more specific scope of humanitarian law. The application of this to extraterritorial operations has been noted by Ryngaert as mixed, with Al-Skeini and others v United Kingdom in 2011 attempting "to square Bankovic [v. Belgium'''s "sufficient control" model of jurisdiction] with the personal model of jurisdiction", and Al-Jedda v United Kingdom'' "tried to reconcile the ‘ultimate control and authority’ standard... with  the ‘effective operational control’ standard endorsed by the UN's International Law Commission." Ryngaert declares each of the two results to be "an awkward hybrid theory".

See also
 Extraterritoriality
 Extraterritorial jurisdiction
 Interpol

Notes and references

Notes

Citations

References 
 
 
 
 
 

Law enforcement
Law of war
Human rights
Military law
Transnational organized crime
International security
 
War and politics
Military operations by type
Extraterritorial jurisdiction